The North Fork Dam is on the Clackamas River, about five miles upriver from Estacada, Oregon. It was built in 1958. The North Fork Reservoir is behind it.

Construction

It is a concrete arched dam, 206 feet high and 676 feet long, is thin-shell of variable thickness. It varies in thickness from 32 feet at the base to 8 feet wide at the top.

The fish ladder

North Fork's construction entailed the building of the 1.9-mile-long North Fork Fish Ladder, one of the longest in the world. It also required a complex system to provide for downstream fish passage around the dam.

References

External links
 North Fork Reservoir Additional Information - Oregon State Marine Board
 A map
 Helping Fish Find Their Way Up The Clackamas
 The elevation, latitude and longitude

Dams in Oregon
1958 establishments in Oregon
Dams with fish ladders